The Good Fight is an American legal drama produced for CBS's streaming service CBS All Access (later Paramount+). It is the platform's first original scripted series. The series, created by Robert King, Michelle King, and Phil Alden Robinson, is a spin-off and sequel to The Good Wife, which was created by the Kings. The first season premiered on February 19, 2017, with the first episode airing on CBS and the following episodes on CBS All Access. 

On July 20, 2021, Paramount+ renewed the series for a sixth season. On May 27, 2022, it was announced that the sixth season will be the series' last;  it premiered on September 8, 2022.

Series overview

Episodes

Season 1 (2017)

Season 2 (2018)

Season 3 (2019)

Season 4 (2020)

Season 5 (2021)

Season 6 (2022)

References

External links 
 
 

The Good Wife
Lists of American drama television series episodes